The 1995 World Weightlifting Championships were held in Guangzhou, China from November 16 to November 26,

Medal summary

Men

Women

Medal table
Ranking by Big (Total result) medals 

Ranking by all medals: Big (Total result) and Small (Snatch and Clean & Jerk)

References
Results (Sport 123)
Weightlifting World Championships Seniors Statistics

External links
http://www.iat.uni-leipzig.de/datenbanken/dbgwh/start.php

W
World Weightlifting Championships
World Weightlifting Championships
International weightlifting competitions hosted by China